This is a synoptic list of events and premieres which occurred, in 2014 in Australian television, the 59th year of continuous operation of television in Australia.

Events 
 1 January – Foxtel launches two new subscription channels Syfy and TV Hits, which replace SF and TV1 respectively.
31 January  – Chris Bath presents her final bulletin for Seven News after deciding to stand down and concentrate on her full-time Sunday Night role. Mark Ferguson replaced her the following Monday (3 February).
 2 February – The Nine Network's GO! channel unveils a new logo, on-air package and demographic (women 20–40), with a revamped timetable with Kids WB, dropping reality TV catch-up programming which they now air on the Network's primary channel only.
 13 March – Foxtel launches Presto, an online streaming service allowing subscribers to access content available on Foxtel Movies separate from a full Foxtel subscription.
 20 March – Showcase wins the Channel of the Year award at the 2014 ASTRA Awards.
 10 April – Two new subscription channels—Disney XD and Foxtel Movies Disney—launch on the Foxtel platform.
 6 July – Adam Dovile and Lisa Lamond win the second series of House Rules and New Zealand animated kids show The Barefoot Bandits premieres on Eleven with the voices of Josh Thomson (The Project) as Fridge, Laura Daniel (Jono and Ben) as Riley and Tammy Davis (Outrageous Fortune) as Tane.*17 July - John Walton dies (aged 62), Actor of stage, television and film, best known as Dr. Craig Rothwell in The Young Doctors
 20 July – The Australian Broadcasting Corporation reverts its flagship ABC1 television channel to its former ABC name.
 21 July – Anja Nissen wins the third season of The Voice.
 3 August – BBC Worldwide is set to launch a new premium drama and comedy subscription channel known as BBC First which will be available on the Foxtel platform.
 13 August – Meyne Wyatt becomes the first indigenous Australian actor in Neighbours''' 29-year history to have a leading role when he makes his debut in the soap as Nate Kinski.
 18 August – The Nine Network secures film rights to revive Paramount Pictures along with DreamWorks, taking them from Network Ten after cost-cutting measures.
 17 September – Johann Wagner wins the first season of The Recruit and was drafted as a rookie to the Port Adelaide Football Club in the Australian Football League (AFL).
 28 September – Australia Network is shut down to be replaced by a similar 24-hour television and online service known as Australia Plus Television.
 1 October – The Antenna Awards are returning to Australian community TV stations.
 18 November – The Abbott Government reduces ABC's annual budget by A$50m, or roughly 5%.
 21 November – Network Ten revives the Sony Pictures output deal. Erin Brockovich was the first film to air on TEN.
 25 November – AFL player David Rodan and his partner Melanie Hooper win the fourteenth season of Dancing with the Stars.
 26 November – Ryan Ginns wins the eleventh and final series of Big Brother.
 1 December – Network Ten revives the Universal Pictures output deal. Bird on a Wire was the first film to air, but screened on ONE.
 1 December – The Seven Network wins the ratings year for the eighth consecutive time topping total people, primary channels, reality (My Kitchen Rules, House Rules & The X Factor), breakfast (Sunrise), weekend breakfast (Weekend Sunrise), morning television (The Morning Show), advertisement breaks, news updates, movies, Sport (AFL, Tennis & Melbourne Cup) and suitable only for people over 55, while Nine wins all three demos.
 7 December - The Seven Network broadcasts Supercars Championship for the final-ever time, before handing the television rights to Fox Sports and Network Ten.

Deaths 

Premieres

 Domestic series 

 International series 

 Telemovies and miniseries 

 Documentaries 

 Specials 

 Programming changes 

 Changes to network affiliation 
Criterion for inclusion in the following list is that Australian premiere episodes will air in Australia for the first time on the new network. This includes when a program is moved from a free-to-air network's primary channel to a digital multi-channel, as well as when a program moves between subscription television channels – provided the preceding criterion is met. Ended television series which change networks for repeat broadcasts are not included in the list.

Subscription premieres
This is a list of programs which made their premiere on Australian subscription television that had previously premiered on Australian free-to-air television. Programs may still air on the original free-to-air television network.

 Returning programs 

 Endings 

See also
 2014 in Australia
 List of Australian films of 2014

 Notes Schapelle was originally scheduled to air on 10 February before being rescheduled to premiere on 9 February instead due to the impending release of the real-life Schapelle Corby.
 Today Tonight was axed in Sydney, Melbourne and Brisbane (East Coast edition), however local versions continued to air in Adelaide and Perth. After TT's demise, Sunday Night became the only current affairs programme on the Seven Network.50 Years Young'' was originally scheduled to air on 8 August before being rescheduled to premiere on 3 August instead.

References